The list of places named after places in the United States identifies namesake places and the eponymic United States place for which they are named.

References

Notes

Lists of place name etymologies